The Rinsennock is a mountain in the Gurktal Alps in Austria. It is part of the Nock Mountains sub-range and located at the border of the state of Carinthia with Upper Styria, immediately west of Turracher Höhe Pass. The summit, at 2,334 metres above the Adriatic (7,657 ft), is a popular destination for hikers.

References
http://www.summitpost.org/rinsennock/173645

Mountains of the Alps
Mountains of Carinthia (state)
Mountains of Styria